I Wanna Have Some Fun is the third studio album by English singer Samantha Fox. It was released in November 1988 by Jive Records. The album features production from previous collaborators Full Force, Stock Aitken Waterman, Steve Power and Steve Lovell, as well as new collaborators, such as Rob and Ferdi Bolland, Kevin Saunderson, Fred Zarr and Chris Tsangarides.

Singles
"Love House" was released in November 1988 as the album's first single in the United Kingdom, reaching number 32 on the UK Singles Chart. The album's title track served as the first single in the United States, where it peaked at number eight on the Billboard Hot 100, while it was released as the third and final single in the UK in June 1989, reaching number 63. The album's second UK single, a cover of Dusty Springfield's "I Only Want to Be with You" (retitled "I Only Wanna Be with You"), was released in January 1989 and became Fox's best-performing single in over a year, peaking at number 16 on the UK chart. It was also the second single in the US, where it peaked at number 31 on the Billboard Hot 100. "Love House", on its release as the third and final single in the US, failed to reach the top 100.

Track listing

Notes
  signifies a remixer
  signifies an additional producer
  signifies a main producer and remixer

Charts

Weekly charts

Year-end charts

Certifications

References

1988 albums
Albums produced by Chris Tsangarides
Albums produced by Full Force
Albums produced by Stock Aitken Waterman
Albums recorded at Sigma Sound Studios
Jive Records albums
Samantha Fox albums